Minister of Regional Economic Expansion was an office in the Cabinet of Canada from 1969 to 1990. On February 23, 1990 the position was merged into that of Minister of Industry, Science and Technology.

Ministers

On December 7, 1982 the position was renamed Canadian Minister of Regional Industrial Expansion. The Department of Regional Industrial Expansion (DRIE) was created when Industry, Trade and Commerce was combined with the Department of Regional Economic Expansion (DREE).

External links
 http://www.ic.gc.ca/eic/site/ic1.nsf/eng/00024.html

Regional Industrial Expansion